William Safran (born 1930) is Professor Emeritus of Political Science at the University of Colorado Boulder. It has been argued that Safran "has contributed substantially to the body of knowledge regarding ethnic politics, nationalism, and related subjects, such as institutional and cultural pluralism, citizenship, immigration, diaspora, national identity, and the politics of language and religion". He is a specialist on France, and much of his research concerns French ethnic politics.

Safran was born in Dresden, Germany, to Romanian and Polish immigrant parents. In his youth under the Nazi regime in Germany, he spent a total of more than three years in a ghetto, forced-labour camp and concentration camp. After liberation, he spent four months in a United Nations displaced persons camp. He migrated to the United States in 1946 with the surviving members of his family. He subsequently gained a BA degree in history and an MA in international affairs from City College of New York, served for two years in the US army, and gained a PhD in public law and government from Columbia University, under the supervision of Otto Kirchheimer, in 1964. He was appointed to the post of assistant professor at the University of Colorado Boulder in 1965. He retired from a full professorship at the same institution in 2003.

Safran was editor-in-chief of the journal Nationalism and Ethnic Politics from its founding in 1995 until 2010. He has also served as a series editor for the Routledge series on nationalism and ethnicity, and has chaired the International Political Science Association's Research Committee on Politics and Ethnicity and co-chaired its Research Committee on Language and Politics. He has held visiting professorships at the Hebrew University of Jerusalem and the universities of Nice, Grenoble, Bordeaux, and Santiago de Compostela.

Bibliography
Safran's publications include the following books:

Veto-Group Politics: The Case of Health Insurance Reform in West Germany (1967)
The French Polity (seven editions, 1977–2008)
Ideology and Politics: The Socialist Party of France (1979)
Politics in Europe (five editions, 1993–2011)

He has also edited or co-edited several books, including:
Language, Ethnicity and the State (2005)
Transnational Migrations: The Indian Diaspora (2009)

References

External links
Homepage at the University of Colorado at Boulder

1930 births
Scholars of diaspora studies
Living people
University of Colorado Boulder faculty
Scientists from Dresden